The following outline is provided as an overview of and topical guide to Star Trek:

Star Trek is an American science fiction entertainment franchise, created by Gene Roddenberry, which started in 1966 with the television series Star Trek (now known as Star Trek: The Original Series). With spin-offs, the franchise now includes twelve television series (nine live action, and three animated) totalling 814 episodes across 38 television seasons, as well as 13 feature films. The Star Trek franchise also includes a large number of novels, comic books, video games and other materials, which are generally considered non-canon.

Star Trek 
Star Trek can be described as all of the following:
 Fiction – a form of narrative which deals, in part or in whole, with events that are not factual, but rather, imaginary and invented by its author(s). Although fiction often describes a major branch of literary work, it is also applied to theatrical, cinematic and musical work.
 Science fiction – a genre of fiction with imaginative but more or less plausible content such as settings in the future, futuristic science and technology, space travel, parallel universes, aliens, and paranormal abilities. Exploring the consequences of scientific innovations is one purpose of science fiction, making it a "literature of ideas".
 Space opera – a subgenre of science fiction that emphasizes romantic, often melodramatic adventure, set mainly or entirely in outer space, usually involving conflict between opponents possessing advanced technologies and abilities. The term has no relation to music and it is analogous to "soap opera".
 Space Western – a subgenre of science fiction, primarily grounded in film and television programming, that transposes themes of American Western books and film to a backdrop of futuristic space frontiers; it is the complement of the science fiction Western, which transposes science fiction themes onto an American Western setting.
 Setting – setting includes the historical moment in time and geographic location in which a story takes place, and helps initiate the main backdrop and mood for a story. The setting has been referred to as story world or milieu to include a context (especially society) beyond the immediate surroundings of the story. Elements of setting may include culture, historical period, geography, and hour. Along with plot, character, theme and style, the setting is considered one of the fundamental components of fiction.
 Fictional location – a place that exists only in fiction and not in reality. Writers may create and describe such places to serve as the backdrop for their stories to take place in. The setting may be of any scope, from a specific spaceship or building to a neighborhood, city, country, world, galaxy or universe.
 Fictional universe – self-consistent fictional setting with elements that differ from the real world. It may also be called an imagined, constructed or fictional realm (or world).
 Science fiction universe – universe with elements of fictional technology or science.
 Intellectual property – creations of the intellect for which a monopoly is assigned to designated owners by law. Under intellectual property law, owners are granted certain exclusive rights to a variety of intangible assets, such as musical, literary and artistic works; discoveries and inventions; and words, phrases, symbols and designs. The typical intellectual property rights granted for fictional works are copyright and trademark.
 Media franchise – licensing of intellectual property of an original work of media (usually a work of fiction), such as a film, a work of literature, a television program or a video game, to others. This licensing may involve trademarked characters and settings. Generally, a media franchise means that a whole series is made in a particular medium, along with licensing to others for merchandising and endorsements.

Media

Canonical media 
 Considered official Star Trek canon.

Star Trek television series 
 Star Trek – the first television series to follow the adventures of the Starship Enterprise and its crew and set in the 23rd century. Now referred to as Star Trek: The Original Series, for clarity. 
 Star Trek – an animated series set after the live action series. It features the voices of the original cast. Now referred as Star Trek: The Animated Series for clarity. 
 Star Trek: The Next Generation – created by Gene Roddenberry twenty-one years after the original, the first episode takes place in 2364. It featured a new Enterprise, new technology and an entirely new cast. 
 Star Trek: Deep Space Nine – set in the Next Generation era, this spin-off series is set on the titular space station, situated on the edge of Federation territory.
 Star Trek: Voyager – another spin-off series set in the Next Generation era, set aboard the starship Voyager as its crew as they attempt to return home after getting transported and lost far away from Federation space.
 Star Trek: Enterprise – a prequel series set on an early iteration of the Enterprise set in the nearby regions of the Milky Way galaxy around the year 2150, over a century before the original Star Trek series.
 Star Trek: Discovery – a series initially taking place shortly before the era of Star Trek: The Original Series and set aboard the Discovery. The first episode takes place in 2256.
 Star Trek: Short Treks – an anthology web series of 10-20 minute shorts related to Discovery, which explore the Star Trek universe and characters.
 Star Trek: Picard – the first episode takes place in 2399, twenty years after the event of feature film Star Trek: Nemesis. It continues the story of former Enterprise captain Jean-Luc Picard.
 Star Trek: Lower Decks – a comedic adult animated series focusing on the support crew of one of Starfleet's most unimportant ships. It takes place shortly after the Next Generation era.
Star Trek: Prodigy – an animated series aimed at kids, set after the events of Voyager and following a motley crew of young aliens who must learn to work together.
Star Trek: Strange New Worlds – a spinoff from Discovery and prequel to The Original Series following Captain Christopher Pike and the crew of the USS Enterprise.

Star Trek television episodes 
 Star Trek episodes
 Star Trek: The Original Series episodes
 Star Trek: The Animated Series episodes
 Star Trek: The Next Generation episodes
 Star Trek: Deep Space Nine episodes
 Star Trek: Voyager episodes
 Star Trek: Enterprise episodes
 Star Trek: Discovery episodes

Star Trek films 
 Star Trek film series – Paramount Pictures has produced thirteen Star Trek feature films. The first six films continue the adventures of the cast of the Original Series; the seventh film, Generations, was designed as a transition from that cast to the Next Generation series; the next three films, 8–10, focused completely on the Next Generation cast. The eleventh, twelfth and thirteenth films take place in an alternate timeline from the rest of the franchise with an almost entirely new cast playing the original series characters.
 Films corresponding to the Original Series era
 Star Trek: The Motion Picture (1979) – V-Ger, an advanced intelligence from another dimension, visits Earth seeking its Creator, and is about to eradicate the Earth's infestation of humans, but has to deal with Captain Kirk and his crew aboard the USS Enterprise first.
 Star Trek II: The Wrath of Khan (1982) – Khan Noonien Singh, a genetically enhanced warlord exiled with his followers by Captain Kirk on a desolate planet for decades, escapes and vows revenge. A cat and mouse contest ensues between them for the Genesis Device, a mechanism capable of destroying a planet and rebuilding its life matrix at the same time.
 Star Trek III: The Search for Spock (1984) – Spock was killed in the previous movie. Or was he? And Doctor McCoy isn't behaving quite like himself. Admiral Kirk reassembles his crew and steals the Enterprise to search for his lost friend and bring him back from beyond the grave.
 Star Trek IV: The Voyage Home (1986) – the crew returns home with a rejuvenated Spock, in a captured Klingon vessel and certainly subject to facing court martial. When they arrive, they find the Earth apparently besieged by a powerful alien spacecraft broadcasting in whale. In order to save Earth from the craft's destructive signal, they attempt to travel back in time to find a humpback whale to communicate with the alien craft to tell it that all is well.
 Star Trek V: The Final Frontier (1989) – the newly commissioned USS Enterprise-A is commandeered by Spock's long-lost half-brother. The crew travels to the center of the galaxy where they meet an alien portraying itself as God, who wants their starship.
 Star Trek VI: The Undiscovered Country (1991) – Captain Kirk and Doctor McCoy are imprisoned for the assassination of the Klingon Chancellor Gorkon. Spock takes command of the Enterprise and embarks on a rescue mission while he uncovers a conspiracy.
 Films corresponding to the Next Generation era
 Star Trek Generations (1994) – Captain Picard races against time to stop a deranged scientist from destroying an entire star system. In the process, he ends up meeting an unlikely ally: Captain Kirk.
 Star Trek: First Contact (1996) – Captain Picard and the crew battle the Borg in the past to save humanity in the present. In the process, they ensure that Zefram Cochrane makes his maiden flight at warp speed.
 Star Trek: Insurrection (1998) – the crew of the Enterprise battles a renegade Starfleet operation who plans to destroy a mystical planet in the name of science.
 Star Trek: Nemesis (2002) – Captain Picard and the crew battle a clone of himself who has taken control of Romulan space and intends to invade Federation space.
 Films in the rebooted franchise
 Star Trek (2009) – in the 24th century, Spock and a Romulan warlord are sent back to the 23rd century through a black hole, disrupting the timeline and forcing the young crew of the USS Enterprise to come together earlier, despite their differences, after the warlord destroys Vulcan.
 Star Trek Into Darkness (2013) – a Starfleet special agent who later reveals himself as Khan Noonien Singh turns terrorist and destroys a Starfleet base on Earth and the newly reinstated Captain Kirk is ordered to take the Enterprise to the Klingon homeworld to dispose of him.
 Star Trek Beyond (2016) – the Enterprise is ambushed and destroyed by countless alien microvessels; the crew abandon ship and are stranded on an unknown planet where they find themselves in battle with a ruthless warlord who has a well-earned hatred of the Federation.

Non-Canonical media

Star Trek books 
 Star Trek reference books
 List of Star Trek technical manuals
 List of Star Trek novels
 List of Star Trek: Voyager novels
 New Voyages episodes
 List of Star Trek: New Frontier characters

Star Trek Fan Productions

Fan films 
 [[Star Trek: Phase II (fan series)|Star Trek: Phase II]] (formerly known as Star Trek: New Voyages)
 Star Trek Continues Star Trek: Encarta Starship Exeter Starship Farragut Star Trek: Hidden Frontier Star Trek: Intrepid Star Trek: Of Gods and Men Star Trek: Odyssey Star Trek: Dark Armada Borg War (animated)

 Fan film parodies 
 Captain's Nightmare Redshirt Blues 
 Star Trek: The Pepsi Generation 
 Star Wreck Steam Trek Stone Trek Fan audio productions 
 Star Trek: The Continuing Mission Star Trek: Defiant Star Trek: Outpost Star Trek: Excelsior Setting 

 People in Star Trek 

 Races in Star Trek 
 Alphabetical list of Star Trek races
 Major races in Star Trek Human – aka Terran, are one of the races undertaking interstellar travel. Human beings were instrumental in the founding of the United Federation of Planets. Although politically fragmented at the end of the 20th century, Humans underwent political unification and made first contact with the Vulcan race in 2063.
 Vulcan – extraterrestrial humanoid species who originate from the planet Vulcan. They are noted for their attempt to live by reason and logic with no interference from emotion.
 Klingon – extraterrestrial humanoid warrior species. An antagonist in the Original Series, turned ally of the Federation in the Next Generation era.
 Romulan – extraterrestrial humanoid species generally depicted as antagonists, and are usually at war or in an uneasy truce with the United Federation of Planets.
 Borg – collection of species that have been turned into cybernetic organisms functioning as drones of the Collective, or the hive. An enemy of all species, seeking to absorb them all. Introduced during the Next Generation.
 Cardassian – extraterrestrial species originating from the fictional Alpha Quadrant planet, Cardassia Prime. Introduced during the Next Generation era, and located in the vicinity of Deep Space Nine.
 Bajoran – extraterrestrial species originating from the fictional Alpha Quadrant planet, Bajor. Introduced during the Next Generation era. In the Deep Space Nine era, Bajor is recovering from fifty years of occupation from the Cardassians.
 Ferengi – extraterrestrial species whose culture is characterized by a mercantile obsession with profit and trade, and their constant efforts to swindle unwary customers into unfair deals. They are also known for their business acumen and for rampant misogyny. Introduced during the Next Generation era, and located in the vicinity of Deep Space Nine.

 Characters in Star Trek 
 Crews of the USS Enterprise NCC-1701 (The Original Series)
 Captain James T. Kirk
 Kirk and Uhura's kiss
 Captain Christopher Pike
 Chief Science Officer Spock
 Chief Medical Officer Leonard McCoy
 Chief Communications Officer Nyota Uhura
 Chief Engineering Officer Montgomery Scott
 Ensign Pavel Chekov
 Lieutenant Hikaru Sulu
 Yeoman Janice Rand
 Nurse Christine Chapel
 The Next Generation Captain Jean-Luc Picard
 Chief Medical Officer Beverly Crusher
 Chief Medical Officer Katherine Pulaski
 Chief Engineering Officer Geordi La Forge
 Commander William Riker
 Lieutenant Commander Data
 Chief Security Officer Worf
 Chief Security Officer Tasha Yar
 Ship's Counselor Deanna Troi
 Ensign Wesley Crusher
 Star Trek: Enterprise Captain Jonathan Archer
 Science officer T'Pol
 Chief engineer Trip Tucker
 Tactical officer Malcolm Reed
 Communications officer Hoshi Sato
 Helmsman Travis Mayweather
 Chief medical officer Dr. Phlox
 Crew of the Voyager Captain Kathryn Janeway
 First officer Chakotay
 Second officer Tuvok
 Helmsman Tom Paris
 Chief Engineer B'Elanna Torres
 Operations officer Harry Kim
 Chief Medical Officer The Doctor
 Cook Neelix
 Nurse Kes
 Astrometrics lab crewman Seven of Nine
 Command crew of Deep Space Nine (space station)
 Commanding officer Benjamin Sisko
 First officer Kira Nerys
 Chief of security Odo
 Chief medical officer Julian Bashir
 Chief science officer Jadzia Dax
 Counselor Ezri Dax
 Strategic operations officer Worf
 Chief operations officer Miles O'Brien
 Crew of the Discovery Captain Gabriel Lorca
 Captain Christopher Pike
 Chief Medical Officer Nambue
 Commander Michael Burnham
 Commander Saru
 Lieutenant Commander Paul Stamets
 Ensign Connor
 Ensign Sylvia Tilly
 Alphabetical list of Star Trek characters
 Star Trek characters (A–F)
 Star Trek characters (G–M)
 Star Trek characters (N–S)
 Star Trek characters (T–Z)

 Astronomy in Star Trek 

 Regions of space in Star Trek 
 Star Trek regions of space
 Milky Way galaxy
 Galactic quadrant – in Star Trek, the Milky Way galaxy is divided into four galactic quadrants: Alpha, Beta, Delta and Gamma.
 Galactic Core – central area of the Milky Way galaxy, lying partially in each of the four galactic quadrants.
 Sector – a sector was a volume of space approximately twenty light years across. A typical sector in Federation space would contain about six to ten star systems, although sectors toward the galactic core would often contain many more.
 Subspace – Subspace is an integral part of the space-time continuum, distinct, yet coexistent with normal space. In Star Trek, "subspace communications" refers to a kind of faster-than-light "radio signal" and is used often to allow characters to communicate across vast interstellar distances.
 Mirror Universe – The "mirror universe" is an informal name for a parallel universe first recorded as visited by James T. Kirk and several officers from the USS Enterprise in 2267 in the episode "Mirror, Mirror". It also appears in a number of Deep Space Nine episodes, a two-part Enterprise episode and a number of Discovery episodes.
 Q Continuum – extradimensional plane of existence inhabited by a race of extremely powerful, hyper-intelligent pan-dimensional beings known as the Q.

 Interstellar powers in Star Trek 
 United Federation of Planets – interstellar federal polity with, as of the year 2373, more than 150 member planets and thousands of colonies spread across 8,000 light years in the Alpha and Beta Quadrants of the Milky Way Galaxy, taking the form of a post-capitalist liberal democracy and constitutional republic.
 Klingon Empire – home of the warrior race known as the Klingons, located primarily in the Alpha Quadrant.
 Romulan Star Empire – interstellar power very similar to that of the Roman Republic before it became the Roman Empire. Romulans share a common ancestry with Vulcans, but are passionate, cunning and opportunistic — in every way the opposite of the logical Vulcans. Star Trek Star Charts place the Romulan Empire into the Beta Quadrant of the galaxy. However, on Star Trek: Deep Space Nine, they are referred to as an Alpha Quadrant power.
 Borg Collective – also referred to as the "hive mind" or "collective consciousness", the Borg Collective is a civilization with a group mind. Each Borg individual, or drone, is linked to the collective by a sophisticated subspace network that ensures each member is given constant supervision and guidance. The Borg inhabit a vast region of space in the Delta Quadrant of the galaxy, possessing thousands of vessels. They operate toward the fulfilment of one purpose: to "add the biological and technological distinctiveness of other species to [their] own... [in pursuit of] perfection".
 Ferengi Alliance – located in the Alpha Quadrant, what the Ferengi Alliance consisted of was never revealed; it may simply encompass the Ferengi homeworld Ferenginar and any uninhabited planets that the Ferengi have colonized, since there was little indication that the Ferengi government exercised authority over any species other than its own.
 Cardassian Union – Orwellian-like power located in the Alpha Quadrant, characterized by strict government control over information and violent force. Its denizens have unquestioning obedience to authority on account of the general lack of personal rights, which provides a contrast to the personal protections of the Federation.
 The Dominion – interstellar power and military superpower located in the Gamma Quadrant.
 Q Continuum – extradimensional plane of existence inhabited by a race of extremely powerful, hyper-intelligent pan-dimensional beings known as the Q.

 History in Star Trek 
 Timeline of Star Trek

 Culture in Star Trek 
 Law in Star Trek
 Sexuality in Star Trek

 Klingon culture 
 Klingon
 Klingon language
 The Final Reflection Romulan culture 
 Romulan
 Tal Shiar

 Federation culture 
 Stardate –

 Starfleet culture 
 Dunsel – 
 General Order 12 –
 Starfleet Academy
 Kobayashi Maru

 Ferengi culture 
 Rules of Acquisition –

 Vulcan culture 
 Live long and prosper –
 Mind meld – 
 Vulcan nerve pinch – 
 Vulcan salute – 
 Pon farr –

 Star Trek terminology 
 Barclay protomorphosis syndrome – 
 Baryon Particle
 Baryon sweep – 
 Bell Riots – 
 Bilitrium – 
 Class M planet – 
 Coaxial drive – 
 Cordrazine – 
 Dilithium – 
 Grups – 
 Imzadi – 
 Jefferies tube – 
 Kobayashi Maru – 
 Kolvoord Starburst – 
 LCARS – 
 M-5 – 
 Neutral zone – 
 Nitrium – 
 Omega particle – 
 Onlies – 
 Operation Return – 
 Pa'nar Syndrome – 
 Project Genesis – 
 Red alert – 
 Spatial anomaly – 
 Static warp bubble – 
 Synthehol – 
 The Picard Maneuver – 
 Tranya – 
 Treknobabble – 
 Trellium-D – 
 Vermicula – 
 Xenopolycythemia – 
 Yeager Loop – 
 Zhian'tara –

 Technology in Star Trek 
 Communicator – 
 Tricorder
 Star Trek materials
 Medicine in Star Trek
 Holodiction – 
 Transporter psychosis –

 Starship technologies 
 Doctor
 Holodeck
 Replicator – 
 Shields – 
 Transporter – 
 Warp drive

 Star Trek starships 
 B'rel class starship
 Columbia (NX-02)
 Columbus
 Copernicus
 D-7 battle cruiser
 D5 class starship
 Delta Flyer
 Delta Flyer
 Enterprise (NX-01) Fesarius Galileo
 K't'inga class starship
 K'vort class starship
 Klingon Bird of Prey
 Klingon starships
 Kronos One Narada
 Negh'Var class starship
 Phoenix
 Raptor class starship
 Runabout
 Scimitar
 Shuttlecraft
 Shuttlecraft Cochrane
 Shuttlecraft Justman
 Spacecraft in Star Trek
 SS Beagle
 Starship Enterprise
 Starship Wellington USS Adelphi USS Constitution (NCC-1700
 USS Billings
 USS Bozeman (NCC-1941)
 USS Challenger (NCC-71099)
 USS Constellation USS da Vinci
 USS Dauntless (NX-01-A)
 USS Defiant
 Defiant (NCC-1764)
 USS Discovery USS Enterprise USS Enterprise (NCC-1701)
 USS Enterprise (NCC-1701-A)
 USS Enterprise (NCC-1701-B)
 USS Enterprise (NCC-1701-C)
 USS Enterprise (NCC-1701-D)
 USS Enterprise (NCC-1701-E)
 USS Enterprise (NCC-1701-J)
 USS Equinox USS Exeter USS Farragut (NCC-1647)
 USS Glenn USS Okinawa
 USS Raven
 USS Voyager
 Vor'cha class starship
 Voyager VI Weapons in Star Trek 

 Star Trek energy weapons 
 Phasers
 Pulse cannons
 Phase cannons
 Phase pistols
 Phased polaron cannon
 Disruptors
 Varon-T disruptors
 Lasers
 Whip

 Star Trek projectile weapons 
 Photon torpedoes
 Chroniton torpedoes
 Polaron torpedoes
 Gravimetric torpedoes
 Plasma torpedo
 Quantum torpedoes
 Spatial torpedoes
 Transphasic torpedoes
 Phased plasma torpedoes
 Positron torpedoes
 Isokinetic cannon
 TR-116 Projectile Rifle

 Star Trek biological, radioactive, and chemical weapons 
 Thalaron radiation
 Metreon cascade
 Trilithium resin
 Cobalt diselenide
 Aceton assimilators

 Star Trek melee weapons 

 Federation melee weapons 
 KaBar combat knife
 Katana

 Jem'Hadar melee weapons 
 Bayonet
 Kar'takin

 Klingon melee weapons 
 Bat'leth
 D'k tahg
 Qutluch
 Mek'leth

 Romulan melee weapons 
 Teral'n

 Vulcan melee weapons 
 Lirpa
 Ahn'woon

 Other melee weapons 
 Ushaan-tor
 Mortaes and Thongs
 Glavin

 Subspace weapons 
 Isolytic burst
 Tricobalt devices

 Other weapons 
 Magnetometric guided charges
 Multikinetic neutronic mines
 Dreadnought
 Series 5 long range tactical armor unit
 Q firearms
 Red matter (2009 reboot)

 History of Star Trek 
History of Star Trek
 History of Star Trek games

 Popular culture and Star Trek 
 Cultural influence of Star Trek
 Comparison of Star Trek and Star Wars
 Trekkie

 Star Trek community 

 Star Trek organizations 
 Official Star Trek Fan Club

 Star Trek publications 
 Star Trek novels

 Influential persons in Star Trek culture 
 Gene Roddenberry – creator of Star Trek Star Trek cast members
 List of Star Trek: The Original Series cast members
 List of Star Trek: The Next Generation cast members
 List of Star Trek: Deep Space Nine cast members
 List of Star Trek: Voyager cast members
 List of Star Trek: Enterprise cast members
 Star Trek production staff
 Star Trek composers and music
 Star Trek script writers
 Star Trek: The Original Series writers

 Variant: Star Fleet Universe 
Star Fleet Universe

 See also 

 Star Fleet Universe
 Where no man has gone before
 Beam me up, Scotty

 References 

 External links 

 Media related to Star Trek at WikiCommons
 Quotes related to Star Trek at Wikiquote
 Appendix of Star Trek terms at Wiktionary
 StarTrek.com—The Official Star Trek website
 Star Trek collected news and commentary at The New York Times Memory Alpha—A Star Trek encyclopedia that uses information only from canon sources licensed by Paramount.
 Memory Beta—A Star Trek encyclopedia that uses information from both canon and non-canon sources licensed by Paramount.
 CBS Video—Free full-length Star Trek: The Original Series episodes provided by CBS (only available in the United States)

Star Trek
Star Trek
Star Trek